The tawny-flanked prinia (Prinia subflava)  is a small passerine bird belonging to the genus Prinia in the family Cisticolidae, a family of Old World warblers. It is widespread and common in most parts of Africa south of the Sahara. The plain prinia (P. inornata) of southern Asia was formerly included in this species but is now usually considered to be a separate species.

Description

It is 10-13 centimetres in length with a long, narrow, graduated tail and a fairly long, slender bill. The tail is often held erect or waved from side to side. The upperparts are grey-brown with rufous-brown edges to the flight feathers and a rufous tinge to the rump. The throat and breast are whitish while the flanks and vent are warm buff. There is a whitish stripe over the eye and the lores are dark. The tail feathers have a white tip and a dark subterminal band.

The sexes are similar in appearance. Non-breeding birds have a longer tail than breeding birds. Juveniles have pale yellow underparts and a yellowish bill. There are many recognised subspecies.

The call is short, wheezy and rapidly repeated. The song is a monotonous series of shrill notes. The male often sings from an exposed perch.

The pale prinia (P. somalica) of North-east Africa is similar but paler and greyer with whitish flanks. It inhabits drier, more open habitats than the tawny-flanked prinia. The river prinia (P. fluviatilis) of West Africa is also paler and greyer and has a longer tail. It is restricted to waterside vegetation.

Distribution and habitat
There are ten subspecies distributed across most parts of sub-Saharan Africa except for the driest and wettest areas. It is absent from much of the Congo Basin, southern Namibia, south-west Botswana and the western half of South Africa. It is found amongst shrubs and grass in a variety of habitats including woodland, savanna and cultivated areas. It adapts well to man-made habitats and is not considered to be threatened.

Behaviour
It feeds on insects and other invertebrates. It forages in small flocks which move through shrubs and undergrowth.

The nest is purse-shaped and made of strips of grass woven together. It is built one to two metres above the ground. Two to four eggs are laid; they are variable in ground colour and usually have brown or purple spots or blotches.

Gallery

References

Barlow, Clive; Wacher, Tim & Disley, Tony (1999) A Field Guide to Birds of the Gambia and Senegal, Pica Press, Sussex.
Serle, W.; Morel G.J. & Hartwig, W. (1977) Collins Field Guide: Birds of West Africa, HarperCollins.
Sinclair, Ian & Ryan, Peter (2003) Birds of Africa south of the Sahara, Struik, Cape Town.
Zimmerman, Dale A.; Turner, Donald A. & Pearson, David J. (1999) Birds of Kenya & Northern Tanzania, Christopher Helm, London.

External links

African Bird Image Database: Tawny-flanked prinia
 Tawny-flanked prinia - Species text in The Atlas of Southern African Birds.

tawny-flanked prinia
Birds of Sub-Saharan Africa
tawny-flanked prinia
tawny-flanked prinia